Bezalel Academy of Arts and Design is a public college of design and art located in Jerusalem. Established in 1906 by Jewish painter and sculptor Boris Schatz, Bezalel is Israel's oldest institution of higher education and is considered the most prestigious art school in the country. It is named for the Biblical figure Bezalel, son of Uri, who was appointed by Moses to oversee the design and construction of the Tabernacle (Exodus 35:30). The art created by Bezalel's students and professors in the early 1900s is considered the springboard for Israeli visual arts in the 20th century.

Bezalel is currently located at the Mount Scopus campus of Hebrew University of Jerusalem, with the exception of the Architecture department, which is housed in the historic Bezalel building in downtown Jerusalem. In 2009 it was announced that Bezalel will be relocated to a new campus in the Russian Compound, as part of a municipal plan to revive Jerusalem's downtown. The new Bezalel campus is planned by the Tokyo-based award-winning architectural firm SANAA.

History

In 1903 Boris Schatz proposes establishing an art school directly to Theodor Herzl, founding father of political Zionism. Schatz envisaged the creation of a Zionist style of art blending classical Jewish/Middle Eastern and European traditions. In 1905, the seventh Zionist Congress passes a resolution supporting the establishment of a Zionist school of art in Palestine. The Bezalel School of Arts and Crafts is officially founded the next year in 1906. The school opened in rented premises on Ethiopia Street. It moved to a complex of buildings constructed in the 1880s surrounded by a crenelated stone wall, owned by a wealthy Arab. In 1907, the property was purchased for Boris Schatz by the Jewish National Fund. Schatz lived on the campus with his wife and children. Bezalel's first class consisted of 30 young art students from Europe who successfully passed the entrance exam. Eliezer Ben Yehuda was hired to teach Hebrew to the students, who hailed from various countries and had no common language. His wife, Hemda Ben-Yehuda, worked as Boris Schatz's secretary.

In addition to traditional sculpture and painting, the school offered workshops that produced decorative art objects in silver, leather, wood, brass, and fabric. Many of the craftsmen were Yemenite Jewish silversmiths who had a long tradition of working in precious metals, as silver- and goldsmithing, which had been traditional Jewish occupations in Yemen. Yemenite immigrants were also frequent subjects of Bezalel artists.

Many of the students went on to become well-known artists, among them Meir Gur Aryeh, Ze'ev Raban, Shmuel Ben David, Ya'ackov Ben-Dov, Zeev Ben-Zvi, Jacob Eisenberg, Jacob Pins, Jacob Steinhardt and Hermann Struck.

In 1912, Bezalel had one female student, Marousia (Miriam) Nissenholtz, who used the pseudonym Chad Gadya. 
  
Bezalel closed in 1929 in the wake of financial difficulties. After Hitler's rise to power, Bezalel's board of directors asked Josef Budko, who had fled Germany in 1933, to reopen it and serve as its director. The New Bezalel School of Arts and Crafts opened in 1935, attracting many teachers and students from Germany, many of them from the Bauhaus school shut down by the Nazis. Budko recruited Jakob Steinhardt and Mordecai Ardon to teach at the school, and both succeeded him as directors.

In 1958, the first year that the prize was awarded to an organization, Bezalel won the Israel Prize for painting and sculpture.

In 1969, Bezalel became a state-supported institution. In 1975 it was recognized by the Council for Higher Education in Israel as an institute of higher education. It completed its relocation to Mount Scopus in 1990.

Ceramics: the "Bezalel tiles"

Decorative ceramic tiles with figurative motives with both biblical and Zionist scenes were created in the 1920s at the Bezalel School, with some surviving until today. In Tel Aviv some of the best known examples are the following:
 Lederberg House (1925) at the corner of Allenby Street and Rothschild Boulevard, ceramic tiles designed by Ze'ev Raban
 Moshav Zkenim Synagogue (also spelled Zekenim), 89 Allenby Street
 Municipal School, 37 Ahad Ha’Am Street (built 1924)
 Bialik House, or Beit Bialik
There are Bezalel-made ceramic street signs surviving in Jerusalem.

Bezalel pavilion

Bezalel pavilion was a tin-plated wooden structure with a crenelated roof and tower built outside Jaffa Gate in 1912. It was a shop and showroom for Bezalel souvenirs. The pavilion was demolished by the British authorities six years later.

Bezalel style
Bezalel developed a distinctive style of art, known as the Bezalel school, which portrayed Biblical and Zionist subjects in a style influenced by the European jugendstil (art nouveau) and traditional Persian and Syrian art. The artists blended "varied strands of surroundings, tradition and innovation," in paintings and craft objects that  invokes "biblical themes, Islamic design and European traditions," in their effort to "carve out a distinctive style of Jewish art" for the new nation they intended to build in the ancient Jewish homeland.

Today

In 2006, the Bezalel Academy of Art and Design celebrated its 100th anniversary. Today, it is located on Mount Scopus in Jerusalem and has 1,500 students. Faculties include Fine Arts, Architecture, Ceramic Design, Industrial Design, Jewelry, Photography, Visual Communication, Animation, Film, and Art History & Theory. The architecture campus is in downtown Jerusalem, in the historic Bezalel building. Bezalel offers Bachelor of Fine Arts (B.F.A.), Bachelor of Architecture (B.Arch.), Bachelor of Design (B.Des.) degrees, a Master of Fine Arts in conjunction with Hebrew University, two different Master of Design (M.des) degrees and Theory and Policy of art (M.A.)

The academy has plans to move back to the city center.

In 2011, the Bezalel student show at the Milan Furniture Fair was described as a "lively runner-up" for the best exhibit.

Notable alumni

Baruch Agadati (1895–1976), Russian-Palestinian-Israeli classical ballet dancer, choreographer, painter, film producer and director
Yaacov Agam (born 1928), sculptor and experimental artist
Gideon Amichay (born 1963), communication artist, cartoonist, writer
Ron Arad (born 1951), industrial designer
Avigdor Arikha (1929–2010), painter
Netiva Ben-Yehuda (1928–2011), author, editor, Palmach commander
Moti Bodek (born 1961), architect, lecturer
Elinor Carucci (born 1971), photographer
Yitzhak Danziger (1916–1977), sculptor
Uri Gershuni (born 1970), photographer
Yoni Goodman (born 1976), animator and illustrator
Nachum Gutman (1898–1980), painter, sculptor, author
Vania Heymann (born 1986), film director
Nir Hod (born 1970), artist
Anat Hoffman (born 1954), executive director of Israel Religious Action Center and director and founding member of Women of the Wall
Itshak Holtz (born 1925), painter
Gurwin Kopel (1923–1990), artist
Yaron London (born 1940), media personality, journalist, actor, songwriter
Joshua Meyer (born 1974), painter
 Roy Nachum (born 1979), contemporary artist
Itay Noy, watchmaker
Ran Poliakine (born 1967), serial entrepreneur
Zvi Raphaeli (1924-2005), painter and Rabbi
Ophrah Shemesh (born 1952), painter
Avigdor Stematsky (1908–1989), painter
Yehezkel Streichman (1906–1993), painter
Lidia Zavadsky (born 1937), sculptor

Notable faculty
Samuel Hirszenberg (1865–1908), painter
Yaacov Kaufman (born 1945), industrial designer
Aaron Marcus, (born 1943), graphic designer and computer artist, Visiting Faculty, 1977–78
Abraham Neumann (1873–1942), painter
Abel Pann (1883–1963), painter
Ze'ev Raban (1890–1970), painter, decorative artist, and industrial designer
Siona Shimshi (born 1939), painter, sculptor, ceramist, and textile designer
Sari Srulovitch (born 1964), artist and silversmith
Joshua Neustein (born 1940), contemporary visual artist

See also
Jewish ceremonial art
List of Israel Prize recipients
List of Israeli visual artists
List of universities and colleges in Israel

References

Further reading
 Dominik Flisiak, JAKOB STEINHARDT (1887-1968). Życie i działalność. Chrzan 2022.
 Gil Goldfine, "Zeev Raban and the Bezalel style," Jerusalem Post, 12-14-2001 
 
 The "Hebrew Style" of Bezalel, 1906–1929, Nurit Shilo Cohen, The Journal of Decorative and Propaganda Arts, Vol. 20. (1994), pp. 140–163
 Manor, Dalia, Art in Zion: The Genesis of National Art in Jewish Palestine, published by Routledge Curzon (2005)
 "Crafting a Jewish Style: The Art of the Bezalel Academy, 1906–1996", 2000-08-26 until 2000-10-22, Montgomery Museum of Fine Arts

External links
 
 Bezalel Catalogue of Student Works
 Timeline of Bezalel Academy history
 absolutearts.com/artsnews
 Zionism and Art: Bezalel Narkiss Speaks in 'Israel at 50' Series

 
Art schools in Israel
Colleges in Israel
Israel Prize recipients that are organizations
Israel Prize in sculpture and painting recipients
Educational institutions established in 1906
1906 establishments in the Ottoman Empire
Universities and colleges in Jerusalem
Film schools in Israel
Mount Scopus
1906 establishments in Ottoman Syria
University and college buildings completed in 2022